Itamar Nitzan (or Nizan, ; born 23 June 1987) is an Israeli footballer who plays as a goalkeeper for Maccabi Netanya.

Early life
Nitzan was born and raied in Herzliya, Israel, to an Israeli family of Jewish descent.

International career
He made his debut for Israel national football team on 5 June 2021 in a friendly against Montenegro. He played a full game in a 3–1 away victory.

Honours

Club
 Israeli Toto Cup: 2019–20

See also 
 List of Jewish footballers
 List of Jews in sports
 List of Israelis

References

External links

1987 births
Living people
Israeli Jews
Jewish footballers
Israeli footballers
Israel youth international footballers
Israel under-21 international footballers
Israel international footballers
Maccabi Herzliya F.C. players
Hapoel Tel Aviv F.C. players
Hapoel Ironi Kiryat Shmona F.C. players
Hapoel Nir Ramat HaSharon F.C. players
Maccabi Petah Tikva F.C. players
Beitar Jerusalem F.C. players
Maccabi Netanya F.C. players
Footballers from Herzliya
Israeli Premier League players
Liga Leumit players
Association football goalkeepers